Zigfrīds is a Latvian masculine given name derived from the Germanic given name Siegfried. People bearing the name Zigfrīds include:

Zigfrīds Anna Meierovics (1887–1925), politician and diplomat 
Zigfrīds Račiņš (1936–1998), singer
Zigfrīds Solmanis (1913–1984), chess master

References

Latvian masculine given names